Hedwig is a German feminine given name, from Old High German Hadwig, Hadewig, Haduwig. It is a Germanic name consisting of the two elements hadu "battle, combat" and wig "fight, duel".
The name is on record since the 9th century, with Haduwig, a daughter of Louis the German. The name remained popular in German high nobility during the 10th and 11th centuries.
Other medieval spellings include Hathuwic, Hathewiga, Hadewich, Hadewic, Hathwiga, Hadwich, Hatwig, Hadwig, Hediwig, Hedewiga, Hedewich, Hedewiih, Hatuuih, Hetvic, Haduwich, Hadawich, Hatuwig, etc. Forms such as Hadiwih, Hadewi etc. suggest that the name is the result of a conflation of two separate names, one with the second element wig "fight", the other with the second element wih "hallowed".

A common German (and also Dutch) diminutive of Hedwig is Hedy. The Dutch form of Hedwig is Hadewych (Hadewijch). The German name was adopted into Swedish (and to a lesser extent into Danish and Norwegian) in about the 15th century and is still in use in Swedish in the spelling Hedvig, with a diminutive Hedda. Finnish forms of name are Heta and Helvi. The German name was adopted into Polish, as Jadwiga. A French form is Edwige (not to be confused with the unrelated Anglo-Saxon Eadwig, Edwig).

Fictional characters
 Hedwig (Harry Potter), Harry Potter's faithful messenger and pet snowy owl in the Harry Potter novels by J. K. Rowling
 Hedwig, a nine-year-old boy alter of Kevin Wendell Crumb in the film Split
 The protagonist of Hedwig and the Angry Inch (musical), an off-Broadway production
 Same protagonist in the musical's film adaptation Hedwig and the Angry Inch (film)
 Hedvig Ekdal, the daughter in Henrik Ibsen’s play The Wild Duck
 Hedwig, the wife of Wilhelm Tell in Friedrich Schiller's 1804 play  Wilhelm Tell

People named Hedwig

Medieval

 Hedwiga (Hedwig of Babenberg; died c. 886), Duchess of Saxony, mother of Henry the Fowler

 Hedwige of Saxony (910–965), German noblewoman and mother of Hugh Capet, King of France
 Hedwig of Nordgau (ca. 922–ca. 993), wife of Siegfried of Luxembourg, first Count of Luxembourg.
 Hedwig of France (970–1013), also called Avoise, Hadevide or Haltude, Countess of Mons
 Saint Hedwig of Silesia (1174–1243), Duchess of Silesia, canonized 1267; see also Hedwig Codex
 Hedwig of Habsburg (d. ca. 1285/86), daughter of Rudolph I of Germany and his first wife, Gertrude of Hohenburg
 Hedwig of Holstein (1260–1324), Swedish queen consort, spouse of King Magnus III of Sweden
 Saint Hedwig of Poland (1373–1399), daughter of Louis I of Hungary and ruling queen of Poland

Renaissance and early modern periods
 Hedwig Jagiellon (1408-1431), Poland and Lithuanian princess, daughter of Jogaila, King of Poland and Grand Duke of Lithuania, and Anna of Celje
 Hedwig, Abbess of Quedlinburg (1445–1511), Princess-Abbess of Quedlinburg from 1458 until her death
 Hedwig Jagiellon, Duchess of Bavaria (1457–1502), daughter of the King Casimir IV Jagiellon of Poland and Elisabeth Habsburg of Hungary, wife of George, Duke of Bavaria
 Hedwig Jagiellon, Electress of Brandenburg (1513–1573), daughter of Sigismund I the Old and his first wife Countess Barbara Zápolya, wife of Joachim II Hector, Elector of Brandenburg
 Princess Hedwig of Denmark (1581–1641)
 Hedwig Eleonora of Holstein-Gottorp (1636–1715), Queen of Sweden from 1654 until 1660
 Countess Palatine Hedwig Elisabeth of Neuburg (1673–1722) German-Polish princess 
 Hedwig Elisabeth Charlotte of Holstein-Gottorp (1759–1818) Queen-consort of Sweden Norway

Modern era
 Hedwig Dohm  (1831–1919), German feminist
 Hedwig von Rittberg (1839–1896), Prussian-German decorated nurse, hospital supervisor
 Hedwig Bleibtreu (1868–1958), Austrian actress
 Hedwig Dransfeld (1871–1925), German feminist
 Hedwig Kohn  (1887-1964), pioneering German physicist
 Hedwig Porschütz (1900–1977), Righteous Among the Nations from Germany
 Hedwig Bienenfeld (1907–1976), Austrian-American Olympic swimmer
 Hedy Lamarr  (1914–2000), Austrian and American actress born Hedwig Kiesler
 Hedwig von Trapp (1917-1972), Austrian singer, daughter of Georg von Trapp, fictionalised as Brigitta in The Sound of Music
 Hedwig Goebbels (1938–1945), one of the Goebbels children
 Hedwig von Beverfoerde (b. 1963), German political activist

References

See also
 
 
 Blessed Hadewych of Meer  (c. 1150–1200) 
 Hadewijch, 13th century poet and mystic

German feminine given names